The Hugh Wooding Law School (HWLS) is a law school in Trinidad and Tobago.

History
Named for Trinidad and Tobago jurist and politician Hugh Wooding, HWLS is one of three law schools empowered by the (Caribbean) Council of Legal Education to award Legal Education Certificates, along with the Norman Manley Law School in Jamaica and the Eugene Dupuch Law School in the Bahamas. It opened its doors to students in September 1973. In its early years, it was marked by a scandal when eight out of its ten tutors and lecturers resigned in protest over a student from the Trindadian Police Service (TTPS) 
who failed his examinations but was not asked to discontinue his studies. In 1996, the Council of Legal Education made the controversial decision to require LLB graduates from the University of Guyana to take an entrance examination for admission to HWLS.

Notable alumni
Kenneth Benjamin, Chief Justice of Belize since 2011
Adriel Brathwaite, Attorney-General of Barbados since 2010
Anthony Carmona, 5th President of Trinidad and Tobago,  ex judge-elect of the International Criminal Court
Hukumchand (class of 2000), former National Assembly of Guyana member
Winston Murray (class of 2000), former Minister of Trade of Guyana
Keith Sobion, graduate and former principal, first local graduate to become Attorney-General of Trinidad and Tobago
 Maureen Rajnauth-Lee, justice on the Caribbean Court of Justice
Charlesworth Samuel, former Member of the Parliament of Antigua and Barbuda
David Thompson, sixth Prime Minister of Barbados 
Cheryl-Lynn Vidal, Belize's Director of Public Prosecutions since 2008
Elson Gaskin, Deputy Governor of the Central Bank of Barbados since 2016
Kamla Persad-Bissessar, 7th and first female Prime Minister of Trinidad and Tobago
Paula-Mae Weekes, 6th and first female President of Trinidad and Tobago
Dia Forrester, first Female Attorney General of Grenada
Sandra Mason, last Governor-General and first President of Barbados.

See also 

 University of the West Indies
 Legal education
 Law degree
 List of law schools
 Caribbean Law Institute

References

Law in the Caribbean
Educational institutions established in 1973
Universities in Trinidad and Tobago
1973 establishments in Trinidad and Tobago
University of the West Indies